Beyond The Border Wales International Storytelling Festival is a Wales-based international arts festival dedicated to celebrating the retelling of the world’s traditional stories.

Begun in 1993, the festival is held every other year over the first weekend in July. The new location of the Festival is now at National Trust, Dinefwr, Carmarthenshire. Along with performances of world myth, legend and folktale, the festival features music, poetry, cinema, dance, theatre and puppetry, together with world food stalls, workshops, Craft Market and bookshops.

Funded by Arts Council of Wales, Creative Europe, FEST and the Major Events Status by the Welsh Government.

In addition to the biennial festival weekend, Beyond The Border runs an active year-round programme of storytelling events and community activities, aimed at raising awareness of the art of performance storytelling and the world’s common heritage of traditional stories.

References

External links
 Beyond the Border Wales International Storytelling Festival official website

Music festivals in Wales
Folk festivals in Wales
Summer events in Wales
Storytelling festivals